Cascade, Michigan may refer to:

Cascade, Kent County, Michigan
Cascade, Marquette County, Michigan